ElecLink is a 1000 MW HVDC electrical interconnector between the UK and France, passing through the Channel Tunnel. 

ElecLink commenced operations on 25 May 2022 following several delays due to safety concerns.

Route

Ownership
It is owned by a subsidiary of Getlink, which owns the tunnel itself. 

ElecLink is the first UK interconnector to be entirely funded by private finance, without being underwritten by electricity consumers.

Construction
The two convertor stations were constructed by Siemens AG and Siemens FIT (Field installation Team). The HVDC cables and the cable between the Folkstowe convertor station and the NGET substation at Sellindge were constructed by Prysmian and installed by Balfour Beatty, while RTE constructed the cable between the Peuplingues convertor station and the Les Mandarins substation. 

A specialist, 500 m long, works train was manufactured by Clayton Equipment for the project to allow the HVDC cable to be installed in 2021 and tested. The train contained drilling modules, monorail modules, jointing platforms and hauling equipment, as well as staff accommodations and was entirely battery-powered.

In the entire length of the tunnel, a hexagonal monorail track was installed, as well as two, 7m high, 4-track helices (one on each end), that was straddled by a cable carrier which could carry sections of 2.5km of HVDC cable into the tunnel. The actual cable pull happened between february and summer 2021, with cable sections then spliced in cleanrooms inside the tunnel. The monorail was later removed.

Project history
Work commenced on the project in 2017. 

The foundation stone of the Folkestone converter station was laid in February 2017, by Jesse Norman MP, Minister for Industry and Energy.

In 2019, the Anglo-French Channel Tunnel Intergovernmental Commission (IGC), which oversees the safety of the Channel Tunnel, suspended part of the project's consent due to concerns about safety of the HVDC cables within the tunnels. This decision prevented the cables from being installed. The IGC was expected to make a final decision on whether the cables can be installed in April 2020, based on a recommendation from the Channel Tunnel Safety Authority, however this approval was again delayed due to further safety concerns and the COVID-19 pandemic.

In December 2020, the IGC announced its approval of the project, with the cable expected to be installed by summer 2021 and commercial operation expected to start in mid-2022.

In February 2022, the IGC and national safety authorities announced their approval of ElecLink, which allowed final testing of the interconnector to commence, with entry into service still planned for mid-2022.

ElecLink commenced operations on 25 May 2022.

See also

Other interconnectors between the UK and France include:
 HVDC Cross-Channel (IFA 2000)
 IFA-2

References

External links
 ElecLink
 Project status update, Dec 2019 (pdf)

Electrical interconnectors to and from Great Britain
Electrical interconnectors to and from the Synchronous Grid of Continental Europe
Proposed electric power transmission systems
Proposed electric power infrastructure in England
Proposed electric power infrastructure in France
HVDC transmission lines
France–United Kingdom relations